Joffre Soares (21 September 1918 – 19 August 1996) was a Brazilian film actor. He appeared in 100 films between 1963 and 1996.

Selected filmography

 Vidas secas (1963) - Fazendeiro (Farmer)
 Manaus, Glória de uma Época (1963)
 Selva Trágica (1964) - Nitan
 Grande Sertão (1965) - Zé Bebelo
 Entre Amor e O Cangaço (1965)
 The Hour and Turn of Augusto Matraga (1965) - Joaozinho Bem Bem
 A Grande Cidade ou As Aventuras e Desventuras de Luzia e Seus 3 Amigos Chegados de Longe (1966) - Lourival
 Entranced Earth (1967) - Father Gil
 The ABC of Love (1967) - Inez's father (segment "Pacto, O")
 Proezas de Satanás na Vila de Leva e Tráz (1967) - Blind Man
 Panca de Valente (1968)
 Viagem ao Fim do Mundo (1968) - Barbosa
 O Homem Nu (1968) - Senator Santos Neves
 Maria Bonita, Rainha do Cangaço (1968) - Salustiano
 A Virgem prometida (1968)
 A Madona de Cedro (1968) - Padre Estevão
 O Dragão da Maldade Contra o Santo Guerreiro (1969) - Horácio, the Coronel / Land Owner
 O Cangaceiro Sem Deus (1969)
 O Cangaceiro Sanguinário (1969) - Justino / Coronel-Colonel
 Corisco, O Diabo Loiro (1969) - Domingos
 A um Pulo da Morte (1969)
 Águias em Patrulha (1969)
 The Prophet of Hunger (1970) - Priest
 A Guerra dos Pelados (1970)
 Uma Verdadeira História de Amor (1971) - Father
 S. Bernardo (1972) - Padre Brito
 Joao (1972) - João
 Trindade... é Meu Nome (1973)
 The Amulet of Ogum (1974) - Severiano
 Sagarana: The Duel (1974)
 Exorcismo Negro (1974)
 Trote de Sádicos (1974) - Delegado
 O Exorcista de Mulheres (1974)
 Noiva da Noite - o Desejo de 7 Homens (1974) - Coronel
 Guerra Conjugal (1974) - Joãozinho
 As Cangaceiras Eróticas (1974)
 O Predileto (1975) - Totônio Pacheco
 O Jeca Macumbeiro (1975) - Januário
 Cada um Dá o que Tem (1975) - (segment "Despejo, O")
 The Last Plantation (1976)
 Os Pastores da Noite (1976) - Mad-Cock / Coq-fou
 Crueldade Mortal (1976) - Antônio
 Um Brasileiro Chamado Rosaflor (1976)
 Soledade, a Bagaceira (1976)
 Padre Cícero (1976) - Padre Cícero
 O Menino da Porteira (1976) - Major Batista
 Tenda dos Milagres (1977)
 Quem Matou Pacífico? (1977)
 O Jogo da Vida (1977)
 O Crime do Zé Bigorna (1977)
 Morte e Vida Severina (1977)
 Cordão De Ouro (1977)
 A Virgem da Colina (1977)
 Batalha dos Guararapes (1978) - Frei Salvador
 Colonel Delmiro Gouveia (1978)
 A Summer Rain (1978) - Afonso
 A Santa Donzela (1978)
 Milagre - O Poder da Fé (1979)
 O Guarani (1979)
 O Coronel e o Lobisomem (1979)
 O Caçador de Esmeraldas (1979) - Fernão Dias
 O Bom Burguês (1979) - O Velho
 Amor e Traição (1979) - Coronel Tonho
 Bye Bye Brasil (1980) - Zé da Luz
 O Inseto do Amor (1980) - Padre
 O Boi Misterioso e o Vaqueiro Menino (1980)
 Cabocla Teresa (1980)
 Bacanal (1980) - Belarmino
 Tempo de Revanche (1981) - El Padre
 La conquista del paraíso (1981) - Joao Mentira
 Amélia, Mulher de Verdade (1981)
 Aberrações de uma Prostituta (1981)
 Dôra Doralina (1982)
 Gabriela, Cravo e Canela (1983) - Cel. Ramiro Bastos
 Águia na Cabeça (1984)
 Quilombo (1984) - Canindé
 Memoirs of Prison (1984) - Soares
 Os Trapalhões e o Mágico de Oróz (1984) - Judge
 O Filho Adotivo (1984)
 Perdidos no Vale dos Dinossauros (1985) - Josè
 Tigipió - Uma Questão de Amor e Honra (1985)
 Jubiabá (1986)
 Por Incrível Que Pareça (1986)
 Sonhos de Menina Moça (1988)
 Sonhei com Você (1988)
 Better Days Ahead (1989) - Coronel
 O Grande Mentecapto (1989)
 Después de la tormenta (1990) - Jesús de las Mercedes
 O Gato de Botas Extraterrestre (1990)
 The Third Bank of the River (1994)
 Felicidade É... (1995) - (segment "Bolo")
 O Cangaceiro (1997) - Tico velho
 Perfumed Ball (1997) - Padre Cícero

External links

1918 births
1996 deaths
Brazilian male film actors
People from Alagoas
20th-century Brazilian male actors